Independência (literally Independence in English) is a tiny neighborhood of the city of Porto Alegre, the state capital of Rio Grande do Sul in Brazil.

The neighborhood was created by Law 2022 of December 7, 1959. There is located a highly regarded and traditional private school of the city, the Marista Nossa Senhora do Rosário school.

Demographics
Population: 6,407 (in 2000)
Area: 40 ha (0.4 km2)
Density: 160/km2
Number of housing units 2,761

See also
Neighborhoods of Porto Alegre

References

External links

Porto Alegre Homepage
Bairros Porto Alegre - Nosbairros 

Neighbourhoods in Porto Alegre
Populated places established in 1959